The Sudeten German county of Römerstadt during the period between 1938 and 1945. On 1 January 1945 the county included:

  3 cities
  58 more communities

The county seat of Römerstadt had on 1 December 1930, 27584 inhabitants; 17 May 1939, 26936 residents; and 22 May 1947, 15541 inhabitants.

Political History

Czechoslovakia / German occupation 

The County of Römerstadt before the Munich Agreement of 29 September 1938 became part of the political district 'Rýmařov' in Czechoslovakia.  In the period from 1 to 10 In October 1938, German troops occupied the area. The political district known today as "Rýmařov" bore the former Austro-German name 'Römerstadt, which included the judicial district city, Römerstadt (Rymarov). After 20 November 1938, the political district became known as Römerstadt, with a military chief administrator, the Commander of the Army, Colonel General von Brauchitsch.

 German Empire 

On 21 November the territory of the county  'Römerstadt''' was formally integrated into the German Reich and became the administrative district of the Sudeten areas under the national commissioner Konrad Henlein  The County administration office was located in the town Römerstadt.

After 15 April 1939 the 'law on the construction of the administration in the Reich Sudetetenland (Sudetengaugesetz) was created. After that, the county of Römerstadt became part of Reichsgau Sudetenland, which was assigned to the new administrative district Opava.

On 1 May 1939 a restructuring of the partially determined counties in the Sudetenland was decreed. Thereafter, the county of Römerstadt was restored to its previous boundaries.

In this state it remained until the end of World War II.

Since 1945, the area belongs once again to Czechoslovakia. Today it is a part of the Czech Republic.

 Communal Constitution 

The day before the formal incorporation into the German Reich, namely on 20 November 1938, all municipalities in the Deutsche Municipal Code of 30 January 1935 assumed that the implementation of the leadership principle was provided for at the community level. There were now in the former Reich usual names, instead of saying:

 Local church: church
 Market Place: market,
 Municipality: City,
 Political district: District.

 Place names 

There were the more recent place names, in the Austro-German version of 1918.

 Localities 

Population (1930/1939)

 Cities 

 Bergstadt (1.296/1.250)
 Braunseifen (1.604/1.586)
 Römerstadt (5.837/5.858)

 Communities 

 Altendorf (1.635/1.646)
 Andersdorf (488/473)
 Arnsdorf (326/317)
 Brandseifen (393/353)
 Deutsch Eisenberg [German Eisenberg] (592/541)
 Doberseik (419/387)
 Edersdorf (522/521)
 Eichhorn (138/174)
 Eulenberg, Markt (276/245)
 Friedland an der Mohra, Markt (1.654/1.751)
 Friedrichsdorf (605/556)
 Girsig (333/372)
 Groß Stohl [Large Stohl] (743/731)
 Hangenstein (406/374)
 Herzogsdorf (304/298)
 Irmsdorf (586/549)
 Janowitz (412/453)
 Johnsdorf (1.365/1.377)
 Karlsdorf (429/372)
 Klein Stohl [Small Stohl] (160/149)
 Kreuz (157/145)
 Kriegsdorf (583/534)
 Lobnig (1.064/ 980)
 Mährisch Kotzendorf [Moravian Kotzendorf](658/638)
 Merotein (190/191)
 Neudorf (481/470)
 Neufang (359/355)
 Nieder Mohrau [Lower Mohrau] (751/804)
 Ober Mohrau [Upper Mohrau] (278/303)
 Olbersdorf (315/292)
 Pürkau (366/349)
 Reschen (434/428)
 Tillendorf (339/328)
 Weigelsdorf (198/206)
 Zechan (212/207)
 Zechitz (405/380)

 Literature 
 Otakar Káňa. Historické proměny pohraničí: Vývoj pohraničních okresů Jeseník, Rýmařov, Bruntál a Krnov po roce 1945. Profil 1976.
 Josef Bartoš et al. Historický místopis Moravy a Slezska v letech 1848-1960. Sv. 4, okresy: Šumperk, Zábřeh, Rýmařov. Profil, Ostrava 1974.
 Jaroslav Vencálek. Okres Bruntál''. Okresní úřad, Bruntál 1998.

External links
 http://www.verwaltungsgeschichte.de/sud_roemerstadt.html
 http://www.territorial.de/sudetenl/roemerst/landkrs.htm  Additional administrative history may be viewed at territorial.de (Rolf Jehke). August 2013.

 Rymarov